= Federation of Ogoni Women Association =

Federation of Ogoni Women Association (FOWA) emerged in the Niger Delta, Nigeria, in the 1990s as a non-violent struggle against the militarization of the Niger Delta communities by the Shell Oil Company. The struggle that FOWA promoted was aimed at improving the political and socio-economic lives of the Ogoni people of the Niger Delta.
